The ARM Neoverse is a group of 64-bit ARM processor cores licensed by Arm Holdings. The cores are intended for datacenter, edge computing, and high-performance computing use. The group consists of ARM Neoverse N1, ARM Neoverse E1, ARM Neoverse V1, and ARM Neoverse N2 as of 2022.

Neoverse N-Series 
The Neoverse N-Series processors are intended for core datacenter usage.

Neoverse N1 
On February 20, 2019, Arm announced the Neoverse N1 microarchitecture (code named Ares) derived from the Cortex-A76 redesigned for infrastructure/server applications. The reference design supports up to 64 or 128 Neoverse N1 cores.

Notable changes from the Cortex-A76:

 Coherent I-cache and D-cache with 4-cycle LD-use
 L2 cache: 512–1024 kB per core
 Mesh interconnect instead of 1–4 cores per cluster

Neoverse N1 implements the ARMv8.2-A instruction set.

The Ampere Altra (2-socket 80-core) and AWS Graviton2 (64-core) CPU platforms are based on Neoverse N1 cores and were released in 2020.

Neoverse N2 
The Neoverse N2 (code named Perseus) is derived from the Cortex-A710 and implements the ARMv9.0-A instruction set.

Neoverse N-Next 
Neoverse N-Next, presumably N3, was teased by Arm alongside the V2 and E2 announcements. It is targeted for systems including DDR5, PCIe gen6, and CXL 3.0.

Neoverse E-Series 
The Neoverse E-Series processors are intended for edge computing. They are designed for increased data throughput at decreased power consumption.

Neoverse E1 
Neoverse E1 is derived from the Cortex-A65AE and implements the ARMv8.2-A instruction set. It support SMT.

Neoverse E2 
Neoverse E2 is derived from the Cortex-A510 and implements the ARMv9-A instruction set.

Neoverse E-Next 
Neoverse E-Next, presumably E3, was teased by Arm alongside the V2 and E2 announcements. It is targeted for systems including DDR5, PCIe gen6, and CXL 3.0.

Neoverse V-Series 
The Neoverse V-Series processors are intended for very high performance computing.

Neoverse V1 
Neoverse V1 (code named Zeus) is derived from the Cortex-X1 and implements the ARMv8.4-A instruction set. It is said to be initially realized with a 7 nm process from TSMC.

According to The Next Platform, the AWS Graviton3 is based on the Neoverse V1.

Neoverse V2 
Neoverse V2 (code named Demeter) was officially announced by Arm on September 14, 2022.

Neoverse V-Next 
Neoverse V-Next, presumably V3, (code named Poseidon) was teased by Arm alongside the V2 and E2 announcements. It is targeted for systems including DDR5, PCIe gen6, and CXL 3.0.

Successors 
With code name Poseidon a successor for Neoverse V1 (aka Zeus) was first publicly mentioned on TechCon 2018. Actual introduction (used by third party chip designers in their products) was given in form of a rough target date of 2021. Its initial realization process is said to be 5 nm by TSMC.

References

ARM processors